Lloyd George Evans (31 July 1915 – 29 July 2002) was a Canadian long-distance runner. He competed in the men's marathon at the 1948 Summer Olympics, placing 16th with a time of 2 hours, 48 minutes and 7 seconds. His personal best time for the men's marathon was 2 hours, 39 minutes and 41 seconds in 1947.

References

1915 births
2002 deaths
Athletes (track and field) at the 1948 Summer Olympics
Canadian male long-distance runners
Canadian male marathon runners
Olympic track and field athletes of Canada
Athletes from Montreal
Anglophone Quebec people